The Panasonic Lumix DMC-FZ38 is a superzoom bridge digital camera, replacing the similar Panasonic Lumix DMC-FZ28 and earlier Panasonic Lumix DMC-FZ18. It is also known as the DMC-FZ35 in North America.

External links 
Review on Trusted Reviews
Specs on dpreview.com

Bridge digital cameras
Superzoom cameras
FZ38